FBI: The Untold Stories is a police drama anthology series which was aired in the United States by ABC from 1991 to 1993.

Overview
Unlike ABC's The F.B.I., which was one of the network's major successes of the late 1960s and early 1970s, F.B.I.:The Untold Stories had no ongoing characters or storylines; each week's show was dramatized by different actors.  Also unlike the earlier program, actual news and surveillance footage was incorporated into the program to add authenticity.  One similarity with the predecessor program was that this one was also based on actual cases handled by the Federal Bureau of Investigation of the United States Department of Justice, and was made with the Bureau's full cooperation and involvement.  Providing continuity from week to week was the ongoing narration of actor Pernell Roberts.

Cases
The Hijacking of TWA Flight 541
Claude Dallas
The Murder of Judge John Wood
Suzie Jaeger Kidnapping
Harvey's Resort Hotel bombing
Alan Berg Case
Buried Alive
The Kidnapping of Tina Risico
Tony Kiritsis
Cooper/McCoy Hijacking
Conner and Dougherty

References
Brooks, Tim and Marsh, Earle, The Complete Directory to Prime Time Network and Cable TV Shows

External links

American Broadcasting Company original programming
1990s American crime drama television series
1991 American television series debuts
1993 American television series endings
1990s American anthology television series
Television series by Universal Television
Television series featuring reenactments
English-language television shows